The Thermoactinomycetaceae are a family of Gram-positive endospore-forming bacteria.

Genera and species
 Desmospora Yassin et al. 2009
 Desmospora activa Yassin et al. 2009
 Desmospora profundinema Zhang et al. 2015
 Kroppenstedtia von Jan et al. 2011
 Kroppenstedtia eburnea von Jan et al. 2011
 Kroppenstedtia guangzhouensis Yang et al. 2013
 Laceyella Yoon et al. 2005
 Laceyella putida (Lacey and Cross 1989) Yoon et al. 2005
 Laceyella sacchari (Lacey 1971) Yoon et al. 2005
 Laceyella sediminis Chen et al. 2012
 Laceyella tengchongensis Zhang et al. 2010
 Lihuaxuella Yu et al. 2013
 Lihuaxuella thermophila Yu et al. 2013
 Marininema Li et al. 2012
 Marininema halotolerans Zhang et al. 2013
 Marininema mesophilum Li et al. 2012
 Mechercharimyces Matsuo et al. 2006
 Mechercharimyces asporophorigenens Matsuo et al. 2006
 Mechercharimyces mesophilus Matsuo et al. 2006
 Melghirimyces Addou et al. 2012
 Melghirimyces algeriensis Addou et al. 2012
 Melghirimyces profundicolus Li et al. 2013
 Melghirimyces thermohalophilus Addou et al. 2013
 Planifilum Hatayama et al. 2005
 Planifilum composti Han et al. 2013
 Planifilum fimeticola Hatayama et al. 2005
 Planifilum fulgidum Hatayama et al. 2005
 Planifilum yunnanense Zhang et al. 2007
 Polycladomyces Tsubouchi et al. 2013
 Polycladomyces abyssicola Tsubouchi et al. 2013
 Seinonella Yoon et al. 2005
 Seinonella peptonophila (Nonomura and Ohara 1971) Yoon et al. 2005
 Shimazuella Park et al. 2007
 Shimazuella kribbensis Park et al. 2007
 Thermoactinomyces Tsilinsky 1899 (Approved Lists 1980) emend. Yoon et al. 2005
 Thermoactinomyces daqus Yao et al. 2014
 Thermoactinomyces intermedius Kurup et al. 1981
 Thermoactinomyces vulgaris Tsilinsky 1899
 Thermoflavimicrobium Yoon et al 2005
 Thermoflavimicrobium dichotomicum (Krasil'nikov and Agre 1964) Yoon et al. 2005

References

Bacillales